My Kinda Groove is an album by American jazz flautist Herbie Mann recorded for the Atlantic label and released in 1965.

Reception

AllMusic awarded the album 3 stars stating "Although the results are not all that essential, the music is pleasing and typically rhythmic; a good groove".

Track listing
All compositions by Herbie Mann except as indicated
 "Blues in the Closet" (Oscar Pettiford) - 5:09
 "Morning After Carnival" - 5:24
 "Vikki" (Dave Pike) - 7:02
 "Mushi Mushi" - 3:26
 "Soul Guajira" (William Correa) - 2:49
 "Spanish Grits" (René Hernández) - 2:29
 "Saudade de Bahia" (Dorival Caymmi) - 6:35
Recorded in New York City on April 6 (tracks 1 & 2), May 6 (tracks 3 & 5), May 7 (tracks 6 & 7) and May 8 (track 4), 1964

Personnel 
Herbie Mann - flute
Marky Markowitz, Ernie Royal, Clark Terry, Snooky Young - trumpet
Jimmy Knepper - trombone
Jerry Dodgion - flute, clarinet, alto saxophone
Richie Kamuca - clarinet, tenor saxophone
Charles McCracken, Kermit Moore - cello
Dave Pike - vibraphone
Don Friedman - piano
Attila Zoller - guitar
Jack Six - bass
Bobby Thomas - drums
Willie Bobo - timbales, percussion 
Carlos "Patato" Valdes - congas
Unidentified string section (tracks 3-7)
Rene Hernandez (tracks 4-6), Oliver Nelson (tracks 3 & 7) - arranger, conductor

References 

1965 albums
Herbie Mann albums
Albums produced by Nesuhi Ertegun
Atlantic Records albums
Albums arranged by Oliver Nelson